PHP-Fusion is a free and open-source web framework based on PHP and MySQL that has an integrated content management system (CMS) among many other features.

To function, PHP-Fusion has to be installed on a web server, this can be either locally hosted or remotely hosted.

PHP-Fusion was one of the five winner finalists at the Open Source CMS Awards in 2007.

See also
 Weblog software
 List of content management systems

References

External links

Blog software
Content management systems
Free content management systems
Free software programmed in PHP
Website management